is a railway station in the town of Misato, Akita Prefecture,  Japan, operated by JR East.

Lines
Misato Station is served by the Ōu Main Line, and is located 239.8 km from the terminus of the line at Fukushima Station.

Station layout
The station consists of a single island platform connected to the station building by a footbridge. The station is staffed.

Platforms

History
Iizume Station opened on June 15, 1905 as a station on the Japanese Government Railways (JGR), serving the village of Iizume. The JGR became the Japan National Railways (JNR) after World War II. The station was absorbed into the JR East network upon the privatization of the JNR on April 1, 1987.

Passenger statistics
In fiscal 2018, the station was used by an average of 133 passengers daily (boarding passengers only).

Surrounding area

See also
List of railway stations in Japan

References

External links

 JR East Station information 

Railway stations in Japan opened in 1905
Railway stations in Akita Prefecture
Ōu Main Line
Misato, Akita